Ipswich High School can refer to:

Ipswich High School, Suffolk, in Ipswich, Suffolk, England
Ipswich High School (Massachusetts), in Ipswich, Massachusetts, USA
Ipswich High School (South Dakota), in Ipswich, South Dakota, USA
Ipswich State High School, in Brassall, Queensland, Australia